José Antonio de Segovia Botella (born 23 October 1982 in Las Navas del Marqués) is a Spanish former road racing cyclist.

Major results

2009
 1st Overall Vuelta a Extremadura
1st Stage 1
 8th Overall Vuelta a la Comunidad de Madrid
2013
 6th Overall Vuelta Ciclista a León
1st Stage 2
2015
 8th Clássica Loulé
2016
 9th Overall Troféu Joaquim Agostinho

References

External links

1982 births
Living people
Spanish male cyclists
Sportspeople from the Province of Ávila
Cyclists from Castile and León